CCGS George R. Pearkes is a  light icebreaker and buoy support vessel in the Canadian Coast Guard. Named for Victoria Cross-winner George Pearkes, the ship entered service in 1986. Initially assigned to Pacific region, the vessel transferred to the Quebec region. George R. Pearkes was assigned to her current deployment, the Newfoundland and Labrador region in 2004.

Design and description

The vessel is powered by is propelled by two fixed-pitch propellers and bow thrusters powered by three Alco 251F diesel-electric engines creating  and three Canadian GE generators producing 6 megawatts of AC power driving two Canadian GE motors creating . The ship is also equipped with one Caterpillar 3306 emergency generator. The ship is certified as Arctic Class 2.

The icebreaker is equipped with one Racal Decca Bridgemaster navigational radar operating on the I band. The ship carries a self-propelled barge. George R. Pearkes has a flight deck and hangar which originally housed light helicopters of the MBB Bo 105 or Bell 206L types, but in the 2010s, the Bell 429 GlobalRanger and Bell 412EPI were acquired by the Canadian Coast Guard to replace the older helicopters. The ship has a complement of 25, with 10 officers and 15 crew. George R. Pearkes has 26 additional berths.

Service history
The ship was constructed by Versatile Pacific Shipyards Limited at their yard in North Vancouver, British Columbia with the yard number 555. George R. Pearkes was launched on 30 November 1985 and entered service on 17 April 1986, the first active vessel in the class.  The ship is registered in Ottawa, Ontario, and homeported at St. John's, Newfoundland and Labrador.

The vessel was initially assigned to the Pacific region and then transferred to the Quebec region. In 2004, George R. Pearkes deployed to the Newfoundland and Labrador region, based at St. John's. The vessel is used for buoy placement, retrieval and monitoring, scientific research, construction programs, search and rescue, icebreaking, and pollution control. In December 2013, the ship was sent to recover oil from the sunken bulk carrier  which had sank in 1985 off the Change Islands.

On 20 August 2015, the ship rescued four people and their boat after their engine had failed in Frobisher Bay,  from Iqaluit. Responding to the distress call on 19 August, drift ice threatened the rescue and the recovery of the boat and its occupants only took place the following morning on 20 August. George R. Pearkes returned them to Iqaluit. In March 2016, Canadian Coast Guard trials with the Schiebel Camcopter S-100 took place aboard George R. Pearkes off the Atlantic coast of Canada.

References

Notes

Citations

Sources

External links

 

Martha L. Black-class icebreakers
Ships built in British Columbia
1986 ships